This page lists all described species of the spider family Entypesidae accepted by the World Spider Catalog :

Entypesa

Entypesa Simon, 1902
 E. andohahela Zonstein, 2018 — Madagascar
 E. enakara Zonstein, 2018 — Madagascar
 E. fisheri Zonstein, 2018 — Madagascar
 E. nebulosa Simon, 1902 (type) — Madagascar
 E. rastellata Zonstein, 2018 — Madagascar
 E. schoutedeni Benoit, 1965 — South Africa

Hermacha

Hermacha Simon, 1889
 H. anomala (Bertkau, 1880) — Brazil
 H. bicolor (Pocock, 1897) — South Africa
 H. brevicauda Purcell, 1903 — South Africa
 H. capensis (Ausserer, 1871) — South Africa
 H. caudata Simon, 1889 (type) — Mozambique
 H. conspersa Mello-Leitão, 1941 — Colombia
 H. crudeni Hewitt, 1913 — South Africa
 H. curvipes Purcell, 1902 — South Africa
 H. evanescens Purcell, 1903 — South Africa
 H. fossor (Bertkau, 1880) — Brazil
 H. fulva Tucker, 1917 — South Africa
 H. grahami (Hewitt, 1915) — South Africa
 H. itatiayae Mello-Leitão, 1923 — Brazil
 H. lanata Purcell, 1902 — South Africa
 H. mazoena Hewitt, 1915 — South Africa
 H. nigra Tucker, 1917 — South Africa
 H. nigrispinosa Tucker, 1917 — South Africa
 H. purcelli (Simon, 1903) — South Africa
 H. sericea Purcell, 1902 — South Africa
 H. tuckeri Raven, 1985 — South Africa

Lepthercus

Lepthercus Purcell, 1902
 L. confusus Ríos-Tamayo & Lyle, 2020 — South Africa
 L. dippenaarae Ríos-Tamayo & Lyle, 2020 — South Africa
 L. dregei Purcell, 1902 (type) — South Africa
 L. engelbrechti Ríos-Tamayo & Lyle, 2020 — South Africa
 L. filmeri Ríos-Tamayo & Lyle, 2020 — South Africa
 L. haddadi Ríos-Tamayo & Lyle, 2020 — South Africa
 L. kwazuluensis Ríos-Tamayo & Lyle, 2020 — South Africa
 L. lawrencei Ríos-Tamayo & Lyle, 2020 — South Africa
 L. mandelai Ríos-Tamayo & Lyle, 2020 — South Africa
 L. rattrayi Hewitt, 1917 — South Africa
 L. sofiae Ríos-Tamayo & Lyle, 2020 — South Africa

References

Entypesidae